TF or Tf may refer to:

Arts and entertainment

Gaming
 Team Fortress, an online multiplayer video game
 Thunder Force (series), a series of shoot-em-up video games 
 Titanfall, a 2014 video game
 TinyFugue, a MUD client
 Tropical Freeze, an installment of the Donkey Kong Country video game series

Television
 Power Rangers: Time Force
 Turtles Forever

Other media
 TorrentFreak, a website on file sharing
 Transformers, a toy line, comic books, animation, video games, and films

Geography
 Telford, a new town in the West Midlands region of England
 TF postcode area, UK, encompassing the Telford area
 Twin Falls, Idaho, US
 French Southern Territories (ISO 3166-1 country code TF)
 Iceland (aircraft registration prefix TF)

Businesses and organizations
 Malmö Aviation (IATA airline designator TF)
 Teknologföreningen, a student organization at the Helsinki University of Technology
 Temasek Foundation, a Singapore-based philanthropic foundation
 Territorial Force, predecessor of the British Territorial Army
 Serve the People (Norway) (Tjen folket), a Maoist Norwegian political organization
Tom Ford, a luxury fashion house founded by designer Tom Ford in 2005
 Tung Fang Design Institute, a college in Kaohsiung, Taiwan

Science and technology

Biology and medicine
 Theaflavin, a type of antioxidant polyphenols flavan-3-ols that are formed from catechins in tea leaves
 Tissue factor, or tissue factor gene
 Transcription factor, a protein that binds to specific DNA sequences
 Transferrin, a blood plasma protein
 Transcellular fluid, a portion of total body water contained within epithelial lined spaces

Computing
 .tf, the country code top level domain (ccTLD) for French Southern Territories
 Tera-flops, a measurement of computing speed
 TorrentFreak, a news website on file sharing
 TransFlash card, a Micro SD removable flash memory card
 TensorFlow, a machine learning library by google

Other uses in science and technology
 Tonne-force, a unit of force
 Triflyl, an abbreviation for trifluoromethanesulfonyl

Motor vehicles
 MG TF (2002), a sports car produced by MG Rover from 2002 to 2005 and by MG Motor UK from 2007 to 2011
 TF Series of Isuzu Faster, the third generation Isuzu_Faster#Third_generation Isuzu Faster

Other uses
 TF1, a French free-to-air Television channel.
 Task force, a unit or formation established to work on a single defined task or activity
 Teaching fellow, a member of the teaching fellowship
 Initialism of "the fuck", a derivative of "WTF" (what the fuck), expressing disbelief or disgust used in SMS language and internet messageboards
 Transformation (disambiguation)